Lasiopodomys is a genus of rodent in the family Cricetidae. It contains the following species:
 Brandt's vole (Lasiopodomys brandtii)
 Plateau vole (Lasiopodomys fuscus)
 Mandarin vole (Lasiopodomys mandarinus)

References

 
Rodent genera
Taxa named by Fernand Lataste
Taxonomy articles created by Polbot